is a former professional basketball head coach for Aomori Wat's in Japan and the former head coach for  Noshiro Technical High School in Noshiro, Akita.

Head coaching record

|- 
| style="text-align:left;"|Aomori Wat's
| style="text-align:left;"|2015-2016
| 52||23||29|||| style="text-align:center;"|8th in Bj Eastern|||2||0||2||
| style="text-align:center;"|Lost in first round
|-
| style="text-align:left;"|Aomori Wat's
| style="text-align:left;"|2016-2017
| 60||29||31|||| style="text-align:center;"|4th in B2 Eastern|||-||-||-||
| style="text-align:center;"|
|-
|-
| style="text-align:left;"|Aomori Wat's
| style="text-align:left;"|2017-2018
| 38||9||29|||| style="text-align:center;"|Fired|||-||-||-||
| style="text-align:center;"|
|-

References

1970 births
Living people
Aomori Wat's coaches
Japanese basketball coaches
Meiji University alumni
Panasonic Trians players
Rizing Zephyr Fukuoka players
SeaHorses Mikawa players
People from Higashikurume, Tokyo
Sportspeople from Tokyo Metropolis